Majholi is a growing town and a nagar Parishad in Jabalpur district in the Indian state of Madhya Pradesh.

Demographics
 India census, Majholi had a population of 11,308. Males constitute 52% of the population and females 48%. Majholi has an average literacy rate of 65%, higher than the national average of 59.5%: male literacy is 75%, and female literacy is 54%. In Majholi, 15% of the population is under 6 years of age.

Tourism

A major tourist attraction in Majholi is the Vishnu-Varaha Temple. It is an ancient temple from the 11th century CE, that has an elephant-sized Varaha statue. In front of the Varaha statue, an Adi Narayan statue rests. Behind the Adi Narayan, the serpent Shesha is sitting between front legs of Varaha. Behind Shesha, his wife is depicted. All four vedas are underneath four legs of Varaha.

References

Cities and towns in Jabalpur district